A Temple of Reason (French: Temple de la Raison) was, during the French Revolution, a temple for a new belief system created to replace Christianity: the Cult of Reason, which was based on the ideals of reason, virtue, and liberty. This "religion" was supposed to be universal and to spread the ideas of the revolution, summarized in its "Liberté, égalité, fraternité" motto, which was also inscribed on the Temples.

Services

The symbols of Christianity were covered up and they were replaced by the symbols of the Cult of Reason. In the Churches of Reason, there were specially created services that were meant to replace the Christian liturgy.

For instance, at the Notre-Dame Cathedral in Paris, on 10 November 1793, a special ritual was held for the "Feast of Reason": the nave had an improvised mountain on which stood a Greek temple dedicated to Philosophy and decorated with busts of philosophers. At the base of the mountain was located an altar dedicated to Reason, in front of which was located a torch of Truth. The ceremony included the crowd paying homage to an opera singer dressed in blue, white, red (the colours of the Republic), personifying the Goddess of Liberty.

Churches transformed into Temples of Reason

After Catholicism was banned in 1792, many of its churches were turned into Temples of Reason, including:
 the Notre-Dame de Paris Cathedral (10 November 1793)
 the Cathedral of Our Lady of Chartres
 the Church of Saint-Sulpice
 the Église Saint-Paul-Saint-Louis
 the Basilica of Saint-Denis
 the church of Les Invalides
 the church of Thomas d'Aquino
 the Panthéon de Paris
 the Church Saint Pierre from Montmartre
 the Cathedral of Our Lady of Reims
 the Troyes Cathedral
 the Notre Dame de Versailles Church
 the Église Saint-Pierre de Caen
 the Église Saint-Martin d'Ivry-la-Bataille
 the Église Saint-Jacques-le-Majeur-et-Saint-Christophe d'Houdan
 the Church of St. James on Coudenberg
 and many others

Criticism 
According to the conservative critics of the French Revolution, within the Temple of Reason, "atheism was enthroned". English theologian Thomas Hartwell Horne and biblical scholar Samuel Davidson write that "churches were converted into 'temples of reason,' in which atheistical and licentious homilies were substituted for the proscribed service".

References

Religion and the French Revolution
French Revolution
Atheism in France